Tuen Mun Catholic Secondary School (TMCSS) is a Roman Catholic secondary school in Tuen Mun, Hong Kong. , John Siu Sze Chuen is the principal.

It was established on 1 September 1987.

References

External links
 Tuen Mun Catholic Secondary School 
 Tuen Mun Catholic Secondary School 
 

Catholic secondary schools in Hong Kong
1987 establishments in Hong Kong
Educational institutions established in 1987
Tuen Mun